The 1992 Czechoslovak presidential election was held from July to October 1992, but parliament failed to elect a new President, foreshadowing the breakup of Czechoslovakia. The incumbent president Václav Havel participated in the first ballot held on 3 July 1992. He ran unopposed but didn't receive enough votes from Slovak MPs to be re-elected. Havel resigned on 17 July due to his failure.

Result

References

Presidential
1992